Izberbash (Dargwa: Избир; , Yizbirbaş) is a town in the Republic of Dagestan, Russia, located on the coast of the Caspian Sea  southeast of Makhachkala, the capital of the republic. Population:

History
It was founded in 1932 as an oil extraction settlement. Town status was granted to it in 1949.

Administrative and municipal status
Within the framework of administrative divisions, it is incorporated as the Town of Izberbash—an administrative unit with the status equal to that of the districts. As a municipal division, the Town of Izberbash is incorporated as Izberbash Urban Okrug.

Demographics
Ethnic groups in the city administrative area (2002 census):
Dargins (65.4%)
Kumyks (14.4%)
Lezgins (7.3%)
Russians (5.1%)
Avars (2.8%)
Laks (2.0%)
Azerbaijanis (1.0%)

Ethnic groups in the city itself (2002 census):
Dargins (64.9%)
Kumyks (14.8%)
Lezgins (7.5%)
Russians (5.3%)
Avars (2.6%)
Laks (1.9%)
Azerbaijanis (1.0%)

Climate
Izberbash has a cold semi-arid climate (Köppen climate classification: BSk).

Notable people
People from Izberbash:
Viktor Bolshov (born 1939), Soviet high jumper
Milana Dadasheva (born 1995), Russian wrestler
Mukhtar Gusengadzhiyev (born 1964), Russian circus actor
Paul Irniger (1913–1939), Swiss serial killer
Akhmed Khaybullayev (born 1985), Russian footballer
Anatoly Slivko (1938–1989), Soviet serial killer

References

Notes

Sources

External links

Official website of Izberbash 
Izberbash Business Directory 

Cities and towns in Dagestan
Cities and towns built in the Soviet Union
Populated places established in 1932